Sergio Alejandro Santana Piedra (born 10 August 1979) is a Mexican former professional footballer and assistant manager of Liga de Expansión MX club Oaxaca. He formerly played as a forward.

Club career
Santana first match in the Primera División de México was with C.F. Pachuca on 7 May 2000, against Toluca. He played with C.F. Pachuca for almost five years, from 2000 to 2005. He was transferred to Chivas de Guadalajara for the Clausura 2006 Tournament at the end of 2005. Sergio was a versatile player for Chivas, playing as a forward, striker, center attacking midfielder, and even as a defensive midfielder on occasions.

Santana stated his desire to leave Chivas following the arrival of Carlos Ochoa, and several months later, it was announced that he would go to Deportivo Toluca F.C. In Santana's first match for Toluca, he scored a goal against Monarcas Morelia. The match ended in a draw at a goal each.

On June 17, 2009, during the Mexican Football draft in Cancun, the Monterrey announced that Santana was to join their squad. With Monterrey, he won a couple of championships and a Concacaf Champions League in 2010.

Santana's last Mexican club was Club Atlas. He had a poor performance, as did the entire squad, in the Clausura 2012.

On 24 August 2016, Santana played his last game against Club América in a group stage match of the 2016 Copa MX Apertura. He was the captain and was replace at the 44th minute. He finished up his career with a total of 451 matches and having played with nine clubs.

International career
Santana represented the Mexico national team in a game against China on 16 April 2008, making his seventh appearance since Ricardo LaVolpe called him for El Tri.

Career statistics

International goals

|-
| 1. || October 6, 2004 || Estadio Hidalgo, Pachuca, Mexico ||  || 7–0 || 7–0 || 2006 FIFA World Cup qualification – CONCACAF Third Round
|-
| 2. || November 13, 2004 || Miami Orange Bowl, Miami, United States ||  || 5–0 || 5–0 || 2006 FIFA World Cup qualification – CONCACAF Third Round
|-
| 3. || November 13, 2004  || Miami Orange Bowl, Miami, United States ||  || 5–0 || 5–0 || 2006 FIFA World Cup qualification – CONCACAF Third Round
|-
| 4. || November 17, 2004 || Estadio Tecnológico, Monterey, Mexico ||  || 8–0|| 8–0 || 2006 FIFA World Cup qualification – CONCACAF Third Round
|-
| 5. || March 11, 2009 || Dick's Sporting Goods Park, Commerce City, Colorado, United States ||  || 5–1 || 5–1 || Friendly
|-
|}

International appearances
As of 11 March 2009

Honours
Pachuca
Mexican Primera División: Apertura 2003
CONCACAF Champions' Cup: 2002

Guadalajara
Mexican Primera División: Apertura 2006

Toluca
Mexican Primera División: Apertura 2008

Monterrey
Mexican Primera División: Apertura 2009, Apertura 2010
CONCACAF Champions League: 2010–11
InterLiga: 2010

References

External links

Footballers from Zacatecas
Liga MX players
C.F. Pachuca players
C.D. Guadalajara footballers
Deportivo Toluca F.C. players
C.F. Monterrey players
1979 births
Living people
Atlas F.C. footballers
Atlético Morelia players
Mexico international footballers
Association football forwards
Mexican footballers